Limax maximus (literally, "biggest slug"), known by the common names great grey slug and leopard slug, is a species of slug in the family Limacidae, the keeled slugs. It is among the largest keeled slugs, Limax cinereoniger being the largest.

Limax maximus is the type species of the genus Limax. The adult slug measures 10–20 cm (4–8 in) in length and is generally a light greyish or grey-brown with darker spots and blotches, although the coloration and exact patterning of the body of this slug species is quite variable.

This species has a very unusual and distinctive mating method, where the pair of slugs use a thick thread of mucus to hang suspended in the air from a tree branch or other structure.

Although native to Europe, this species has been accidentally introduced to many other parts of the world, first discovered outside its native range in Philadelphia, USA in 1867.

Description

External anatomy 
The body length of the adult is 10-20 cm (4-8 in).

The greater part of the body is rounded, but there is a short keel on its tail, with about 48 longitudinal rows of elongate, detached tubercles.
The body color is pale-grey, ash-colored, brownish or sometimes yellowish-white. The body is longitudinally streaked or spotted with black. The pattern of spotting is variable. The shield is always black-spotted. The sole of the foot is a uniform ash or yellowish-ash color. The foot-fringe is pale, with a row of minute submarginal blackish tubercles.

The tentacles are very long and slender. The reproductive pore is near the base of the right upper tentacle.

The shield is oblong, about one third of the total length of the animal. The shield is rounded in front, angular behind, and forming an angle of about 80 degrees when in motion, usually of a similar tint to the body, but boldly marbled or maculate with black, somewhat concentrically and interruptedly ridged around a sub-posterior nucleus.

The pneumostome is just posterior to the midpoint of the mantle, as it is in all Limacidae.

The mucus is colorless and iridescent, and not very adhesive.

Although color varieties have no actual taxonomic significance, a large number of color varieties have been described, prominent among them being the varieties serpentinus, vulgaris, cellarius (typical), johnstoni, maculatus, ferrussaci, obscurus, fasciatus and rufescens, of Alfred Moquin-Tandon, and cornaliee, of Pini.

Internal anatomy 

The shell of Limax maximus is reduced and internal, under the shield. The occurrence of this internal shell was known to Pliny the Elder; the shell was used by the ancient physicians for the sake of its carbonate of lime.

The calcitic shell is situated beneath the hinder part of the shield, and is perceptible through the skin. The color of the shell is whitish. The shape of the shell is oblong-oval and thin, slightly convex above, and correspondingly concave beneath, with a membranous margin. The apex or nucleus is at the posterior margin but inclined towards the left side, and forming the apophysis by which the shell is organically attached to the animal. The length of the shell is 13 mm (1/2 inch) and the width of the shell is 7 mm (1/4 inch). Shells of different Limacidae species are undiagnostic: in other words, they are not helpful for identification purpose.

Digestive system: The formula of the radula is: 62-73/ × 138–157. The intestine has six convolutions and is without a caecum. Of the six convolutions of the intestine, four are imbedded in the liver, and two hang freely in the body cavity.

The nervous system is composed of the typical ganglia. The pedal ganglia are placed beneath the radula sac and joined by an anterior and a posterior commissure. The abdominal ganglion lies a little to the right of the median line. The visceral ganglia occupy the angle between the lingual sheath and the oesophagus and the buccal ganglia are widely separated but joined by a commissure nearly as thick as the ganglia themselves.

Reproductive system: The hermaphrodite gland (HG) is elongated and large, and is connected with spermoviduct (SO) by means of the hermaphrodite duct (HD) which takes its course through a portion of the albumen gland (AG). The spermoviduct is thick and well convoluted, and separates further down into a vas deferens or sperm-duct (VD) and an oviduct (OV). The former opens into the upper end of a very long penis (P), to which a strong retractor muscle (PRM) is attached. The lower portion of the penis unites with that of the oviduct at the genital orifice, so that there is no vestibule. The receptaculum seminis (RS) opens into the lower end of the penis near the junction of the two ducts.

Distribution

Fossil distribution 
The internal shells of the different species of Limacidae are not recognizable to the species level. Therefore, the fossil distribution of Limax maximus (and other Limacidae species) is unknown. Unidentified calcitic shells of Limacidae are known from European Tertiary and Quaternary deposits.

Indigenous distribution 
This species is now widely distributed around the world, but it is generally considered to be native to Europe and Mediterranean countries of Africa.

Western Europe: 
 Great Britain - Limax maximus was first described in England in Animalium Angliae Tres Tractatus … Alter de Cochleis tum Terrestribus tum Fluviatilibus by Martin Lister in 1678. The presence of Limax maximus in England had been noted twelve years earlier in Christopher Merret's Pinax Rerum Naturalium Britannicarum.
 Ireland
 Benelux: Belgium, Netherlands, Luxembourg
 France
Germany
 Italy
 Switzerland
 Spain
 Portugal
Eastern Europe:
 Albania
 Bosnia-Hercegovina
 Bulgaria
 Croatia
 Greece
 Serbia
Africa:
 Egypt
 Algeria
 Morocco

Nonindigenous distribution 
The non-indigenous distribution of Limax maximus includes many countries worldwide:
Europe: 
 all remaining countries not already listed above.

Africa
 Mozambique
 South Africa
North America:
 Canada (present in 5 of 10 provinces)
 Mexico
 United States (present in 46 of 50 states)
South America:
 Argentina
 Brazil
 Chile
 Colombia
Asia:
 China
 Japan
 India
Oceania:
 Australia
 New Zealand

Behavior 
Limax maximus is nocturnal, feeding at night. It is not very active or prolific. When alarmed, or at rest, this slug merely draws its head within the shield, but does not otherwise contract its body. When irritated, it is said to expand its shield.

The homing instinct is strongly developed in this species, which, after its nocturnal rambles or foraging expeditions, usually returns to the particular crevice or chink in which it has established itself.

Limax maximus is capable of associative learning, specifically classical conditioning, because it is capable of aversion learning and other types of learning. It can also detect deficiencies in a nutritionally incomplete diet if the essential amino acid methionine is experimentally removed from its food.

Ecology

Habitat 
The slug is almost always found near human habitation — usually in lawns, gardens, cellars or in other damp areas.

This species is not gregarious. It frequents gardens, damp and shady hedgerows and woods, hiding during the day beneath stones, under fallen trees, or other obscure and damp places. It does however exhibit a decided preference for the vicinity of human habitations, and readily takes up its abode in damp cellars or outbuildings.

In Ireland, this predilection for human dwellings is not exhibited, and the species is restricted to woods and other similar places. It may even be met almost within a high-water mark on the seashore.

Feeding habits 
Limax maximus is omnivorous. It is listed as a major agricultural pest by the Institute of Food and Agricultural Science Florida.

Life cycle 

The eggs of this slug are deposited in a cluster, slightly attached to each other. Eggs are transparent, elastic and slightly yellowish in color. The size of the egg is 6×4.5 mm. They hatch in about a month.

The tiny slugs which emerge from the eggs need at least two years to reach sexual maturity.

The lifespan of Limax maximus is 2.5–3 years.

Mating 

The mating habits of Limax maximus are considered unusual among slugs: the hermaphrodite slugs court, usually for hours, by circling and licking each other. After this, the slugs will climb into a tree or other high area and then, entwined together, lower themselves on a thick string of mucus, evert their white translucent mating organs (penises) from their gonopores (openings on the right side of the head), entwine these organs, and exchange sperm. Both participants will later lay hundreds of eggs.

Parasites 
Parasites of Limax maximus include the nematode Agfa flexilis, which lives in its salivary glands, the nematode Angiostoma limacis, which lives in its rectum, and Angiostrongylus costaricensis.

Like some other slugs, this species is often infested by the white parasitic slug mite Riccardoella limacum. This mite swarms its body and invades its respiratory cavity.

A meningitis-causing nematode, Angiostrongylus cantonensis, which normally infests the lungs of rats, has a larval stage which can only live in molluscs, including slugs. This nematode was once known to be a problem only in tropical areas, but it has since spread to other regions. Live slugs that are accidentally eaten with improperly cleaned vegetables, such as lettuce, or slugs which have been improperly cooked, can act as vectors for the parasite.

Gallery

References 
This article incorporates public domain text from references.
 Spencer, H.G., Marshall, B.A. & Willan, R.C. (2009). Checklist of New Zealand living Mollusca. pp 196–219 in Gordon, D.P. (ed.) New Zealand inventory of biodiversity. Volume one. Kingdom Animalia: Radiata, Lophotrochozoa, Deuterostomia. Canterbury University Press, Christchurch.

Notes

External links 
 Limax maximus at Animalbase taxonomy,short description, distribution, biology,status (threats), images 
 Images of Mating
Giant Garden Slug, Aliens Among Us.  Virtual Exhibit of the Virtual Museum of Canada.

Further reading 

Limacidae
Gastropods described in 1758
Gastropods of Lord Howe Island
Molluscs of Europe
Taxa named by Carl Linnaeus